is a Japanese gravure idol, actress and variety tarento. She has been represented by Emsworth and later Fantastar (part of Vithmic).

Filmography
Prior to September 2012, she was active under the name Airi Hirayama.

Films

Stage

Television

Advertisements

DVD

Photo albums

Others

References

External links 

 

Japanese gravure idols
Japanese television personalities
21st-century Japanese actresses
People from Hirakata
1992 births
Living people